Franz Ludwig (1876–1927) was a German stage and film actor. He became known for his portrayals of the German Chancellor Otto Von Bismarck.

Selected filmography
 Bismarck (1914)
 Bismarck (1925)
 Bismarck 1862–1898 (1927)
 The Vulture Wally (1940)

References

Bibliography

External links

1876 births
1927 deaths
German male stage actors
German male film actors
Male actors from Berlin